Protestant orthodoxy may refer to:

 Lutheran orthodoxy
 Reformed orthodoxy
 Neo-orthodoxy

See also 
 Protestant scholasticism